Jacobus Petri Finno (about 1540–1588), sometimes known as Jaakko Finno or the proper Finnish form of his fake name Jaakko Suomalainen (James the Finn), was a Finnish priest and the rector (headmaster) of the Cathedral School of Turku. He was the publisher of the first Finnish-language hymnal as well as a catechism and a prayer book. Finno was doctrinally a moderate reformer.

References

Jaakko Finnon virsikirja. Toimittanut ja jälkisanan laatinut Pentti Lempiäinen. Suomalaisen Kirjallisuuden Seuran toimituksia 463. Alkuteos julkaistu: Tukholma, noin 1583. Näköispainos sekä uudelleen ladottu laitos alkuperäisestä tekstistä ja sitä täydentävistä käsikirjoituksista. Helsinki: Suomalaisen kirjallisuuden seura, 1988. .
Varpio, Yrjö & Liisi Huhtala 1999: Suomen kirjallisuushistoria. Suomalaisen Kirjallisuuden Seura. Helsinki.

Finnish writers
Lutheran writers
Finnish Lutheran hymnwriters
16th-century Finnish Lutheran clergy
Translators to Finnish
1540 births
1588 deaths